Squale SA is a Swiss watch brand founded in 1959 by Charles von Büren, specializing in professional diving watches. Squale is owned by the Maggi Family, who had previously been distributors of von Büren/Squale watches in Italy.

History 

As early as 1948, Charles von Büren began assembling watches under his name. Years later, in 1959, von Büren registered the Squale trademark in Neuchâtel, Switzerland. 

During the 1960s and 1970s, Squale provided cases for Altanus Genève, Arlon, Potens Prima, Prima Flic, Jean Perret Geneva, Ocean Diver / Blandford, Deman Watch, Margi, Berio, Eagle Star Genève, La Spirotechnique, Wertex, Carlson Tavernier Geneva, and Sinn. Cases designed for 500m water resistance with the crown located at the 4 o'clock position were sold to Airin, Dodane, Blancpain, Tag Heuer, Doxa, Zeno, and Auricoste. Squale also supplied the Folgore Parachute Brigade, part of the Italian Air Force, and the Italian Navy's Diving Corps with timepieces during this period.

In 1974, Squale entered the watch market as an independent entity.

In 1989, following the watch industry's "quartz crisis," Squale halted their production of mechanical watches in order to focus on quartz timepieces. This led to the creation of the "Squale Rambo." Like many watch companies at the time, Squale began to fade from the international watch market.

After the retirement of Charles von Büren, the Maggi families and the former Italian distributors of von Büren watches partnered with one another.

The brand relaunched in 2010 with its headquarters in Milan and watchmaking being done in Chiasso, Switzerland.

In 2020, Squale moved its headquarters entirely to Chiasso, Switzerland.

Name and logo 
Squale is a French word for shark. The E is silent and it is pronounced "Skwal." In 1946, Charles von Büren created C.Von Büren SA in Neuchâtel, Switzerland. In 1959, after testing the reliability of the watch cases himself on numerous occasion, he registered the Squale trademark. Squale is now based in Chiasso and is in partnership with the Maggi family from Italy.

Notable owners 
 Jackie Chan wore a Squale Rambo during the 1987 film Armour of God.
 The 1967 national Cuban Diving Team.
 James Marsden has been seen wearing a Squale 50 Atmos Ref. 1521-026A
 Jacques Mayol broke the world record for breath-hold deep diving on numerous occasions while wearing Squale watches.
 Tony Salvatori, 1967 French champion spearfisher
 Jean Tapu, world champion diver, 1967 
 Maria "Jolly" Treleani, world record breaking deep diver (triple world champion of apnea, 1965, 1966 and 1967)

Watch models 
Current models:
 1521 Collection
 1545 Collection
 Super Squale Collection
 2002 Collection
 Matic Collection
 SUB-39 Collection
 T-183 Collection

Former models:
 Squale Rambo
 Master Collection
 Tiger Collection

References

External links 
 Official website

Swiss watch brands
Manufacturing companies based in Milan